Purified is the seventh studio album by American singer CeCe Winans. It was released under her own label, Puresprings Gospel, on September 13, 2005 in the United States. Purified won the Grammy Award for Best Contemporary Soul Gospel Album at the 48th Annual Grammy Awards on February 8, 2006, while the song "Pray" won a Grammy for Grammy Award for Best Gospel/Contemporary Christian Music Performance.

The singles "Pray" and "All That I Need" were released in July in anticipation of the album's release. Winans' nephew, Mario Winans, produced the former. It reached number one on Billboards Hot Gospel Songs chart, while "Let Everything That Hath Breath" peaked at number 8 on the Dance Music/Club Play chart.

Critical reception

Rick Anderson for AllMusic writes, "Her seventh solo album is a mixed bag, thematically speaking, combining funky pop music, moderately gritty R&B, and more typical gospel fare."

Stan North begins his review for GospelFlava by writing, "On Purified, CeCe Winans' seventh solo project, the emphasis swings back to catchy, soulful jams, with pop sensibilities. And she brings in some familiar names —both family and friends— to do it."

Track listing

Notes
  denotes an additional producer

Charts

Weekly charts

Year-end charts

References

CeCe Winans albums
2005 albums